The Botzer is a mountain in the Stubai Alps in South Tyrol, Italy.

References 
Walter Klier, Alpenvereinsführer Stubaier Alpen, München 2006, 
Eduard Richter, Die Erschließung der Ostalpen, II. Band, Berlin, Verlag des Deutschen und Oesterreichischen Alpenvereins, 1894
Casa Editrice Tabacco, carta topografica 1:25.000, Blatt 038, Vipiteno, Alpi Breonie / Sterzing,StubaierAlpen
Alpenvereinskarte 1:25.000, Blatt 31/1 Stubaier Alpen, Hochstubai

External links 

Mountains of the Alps
Mountains of South Tyrol
Alpine three-thousanders
Stubai Alps